Martín Barahona (1943-March 23, 2019) was an El Salvador Anglican bishop. He served as head of the Anglican-Episcopal Church of El Salvador.

In April 2002, he was elected primate of the Anglican Church in Central America.

A man shot at Barahona on March 17, 2010, missing Barahona but hitting his driver, Francis Martínez.

He eventually was succeeded as bishop of El Salvador by Juan David Alvarado, who took office in 2015.

Barahona died from cancer on March 23, 2019 at Hospital Divina Providencia in San Salvador.

References

Anglican bishops of El Salvador
2019 deaths
Shooting survivors
Deaths from cancer in El Salvador
1943 births
Anglican archbishops of Central America